Anacithara caelatura is a species of sea snail, a marine gastropod mollusk in the family Horaiclavidae.

Description
The length of the shell attains 4.5 mm, its diameter 2 mm.

(Original description) The small, rather solid shell has a fusiform shape. Its colour is buff, with an indistinct pale ferruginous band on the shoulder. It contains six whorls, rounded above, constricted at the sutures, and contracted at the base. The ribs are perpendicular, narrow, widely spaced, not continuing from whorl to whorl. The number nine on the penultimate whorl, on the body whorl eight. Fine even close-set
spirals overrun the whole shell. The wide aperture is unarmed. The varix is high and broad. The sinus is wide and rather deep. The siphonal canal is short and broad.

Distribution
This marine species is endemic to Australia and occurs off Queensland.

References

External links
  Tucker, J.K. 2004 Catalog of recent and fossil turrids (Mollusca: Gastropoda). Zootaxa 682:1–1295.

caelatura
Gastropods of Australia
Gastropods described in 1922